Louise Margaret Haigh (born 22 July 1987) is a British politician serving as Shadow Secretary of State for Transport since 2021. A member of the Labour Party, she was elected as the Member of Parliament (MP) for Sheffield Heeley at the 2015 general election, as the youngest Labour member of that parliament. She served as Shadow Secretary of State for Northern Ireland from 2020 to 2021.

Early life
Haigh grew up on Abbeydale Road, Sheffield, and now lives in Norfolk Park, Sheffield. She was educated at Sheffield High School, an independent school. She then studied government and economics at the London School of Economics but did not complete the course, and opted to study politics at the University of Nottingham. Her grandfather and uncle were trade union officials.

After graduating, Haigh worked for the local council youth service from 2006 to 2008. She then began working in Parliament, where she was the co-ordinator of the all party parliamentary group on international corporate responsibility. During this time, she was also a Unite shop steward and volunteered as a special constable in the Metropolitan Special Constabulary from 2009 to 2011.

From 2012, Haigh worked for Aviva as public policy manager, responsible for corporate governance and responsible investment policy.

Political career

Member of Parliament for Sheffield Heeley (2015–present)
Haigh was selected to stand for the Labour Party in Sheffield Heeley in May 2014. She was first elected to Parliament at the May 2015 general election and re-elected in June 2017 and December 2019.

Haigh was declared the "most hard-working" new MP in February 2016 after a study of the activity of MPs elected in 2015.

Haigh was instrumental in revealing that hundreds of women had their tax credits stopped in error by US company Concentrix. The revelation led to an announcement that their HMRC contract would not be renewed. Panic alarms have been installed in Haigh's office and home by South Yorkshire Police after she received death threats for calling for a debate on the banning of Britain First, the far-right group. South Yorkshire Police have provided her with uniformed and undercover protection as she attends to her constituency activities.

In November 2016 Haigh introduced a private member's bill calling for statutory leave from work for living organ donors, after a constituent complained of being given three days’ unpaid holiday after donating bone marrow.

In April 2019 Haigh introduced a private member's bill that would remove the automatic parental rights of fathers of children conceived through rape. The bill would also establish an inquiry into the family court's handling of domestic abuse and violence against women and girls. This Bill was borne out of Haigh's work with Sammy Woodhouse, a survivor of child sexual exploitation, to increase protections for victims of abuse.

Haigh is a member of a number of all-party parliamentary groups, including the APPGs on corporate governance, refugees, colombia and looked-after children. In July 2017 she was elected vice chair of the APPG on state pension inequality and in February 2019 became a joint chair of the APPG on social care.

Shadow minister (2015–2020)

In September 2015, Haigh was appointed Shadow Minister for Civil Service and Digital Reform. The role, newly expanded under Jeremy Corbyn, covers the Government's digital strategy, the Freedom of Information Act, data security and privacy. In this role, Haigh criticised a 2016 reshuffle of Permanent Secretaries which saw two fewer women as departmental heads. She opposed the closure of the Department for Business, Innovation and Skills office in Sheffield city centre, saying the decision demonstrated "contempt" for the city.

On 10 October 2016, she was made Shadow Minister for the Digital Economy. Haigh served in this role during the passage of the Digital Economy Act (2017) and introduced a number of amendments, including an obligation for television broadcasters to include subtitles and closed captioning in on-demand content online which was adopted by a subsequent Government amendment. She has repeatedly raised concerns about child protection online, including calling for social media companies to recognise "that alongside their new-found power, they have responsibilities" in dealing with harmful and illegal content.

She also called for compulsory online education alongside sex and relationships education in schools, citing an 800% increase in children contacting the NSPCC about online abuse.

On 3 July 2017, she was made Shadow Policing Minister. Haigh has called for greater protection for police officers involved in vehicle pursuits, saying the current rules are "hampering the ability of the police to apprehend very serious offenders". In this role she has raised the issue of stress and mental health of officers, citing a 77% rise in officer leave due to mental health between 2014 and 2018. She has called for a "public health approach" to reducing violent crime and blamed the rise in crime on government spending cuts to both police and other public services.

Shadow Secretary of State for Northern Ireland (2020–2021)
On 6 April 2020, Haigh replaced Tony Lloyd as the interim Shadow Secretary of State for Northern Ireland, following Lloyd's hospitalisation as a result of the COVID-19 virus. On 28 April 2020, Lloyd resigned as Shadow Northern Ireland Secretary to focus on recovery, and Haigh replaced him permanently. She is the second woman after Mo Mowlam to serve as the Shadow Secretary of State for Northern Ireland.

Haigh made her first visit to Northern Ireland as Shadow Secretary of State in August 2020. After Brexit she was in charge of Northern Ireland policy in relation to the Northern Ireland Protocol. She said “We’re a unionist party in the Labour Party, but if there is a border poll we should remain neutral. I think that’s an important principle." This was criticised for undermining the views of Keir Starmer who said he would side with unionists in any poll.

Shadow Secretary of State for Transport (2021–present)
On 29 November 2021, during the shadow cabinet reshuffle, Haigh was appointed as the Shadow Secretary of State for Transport. She was replaced as Shadow Northern Ireland Secretary by Peter Kyle.

Views and policies
Haigh is concerned that forcing police to find more to pay for police pensions out of their general budget leaves less money for the police to protect the public.  Haigh stated, "Forcing the police at the last minute to bear the huge cost of pension changes demonstrates the utter failure of ministers to grasp the crisis in policing caused by their cuts. They have played fast and loose with public safety and the police are right to step up and take action."

Haigh also feels it is wrong that the police are forced to deal with mental health crises that has been caused by underfunding of the NHS. Haigh said, “The government’s underfunding of mental health services is a national scandal and passing the buck to our overstretched police officers is exacerbating the crisis in policing. It is frankly shocking that the police are often the only people who someone experiencing a mental health crisis can turn to. Nearly a decade of brutal austerity has torn at the fabric of our society and the most vulnerable are being failed.”

She has spoken out about the crisis within the special education needs system. She has said, "School funding cuts that have resulted in the loss of teaching assistants, a narrower curriculum, and bigger class sizes have all made certain mainstream schools more hostile environments for children with SEN."

Haigh has also been outspoken in her opposition to fracking. She has said, "I do not support fracking for a number of reasons: health and safety; the potential for earth tremors; the likely pollution of the water table; the impact on local communities in terms of disruption and subsidence; the fact that the chemicals used are deleterious to our health. Crucially, we also know that fracking contributes significantly to climate change and so, while all of the above means that fracking should absolutely not take place on an island as populated and as unconducive as ours, the evidence clearly shows that we should reject it outright."

Haigh campaigned for the United Kingdom to remain a member of the European Union in the 2016 United Kingdom European Union membership referendum.

Labour leadership elections
Haigh was one of 36 Labour MPs to nominate Jeremy Corbyn as a candidate in the Labour leadership election of 2015, although she later said she regrets this decision. She supported and campaigned for Andy Burnham, however.

In the 2016 Labour leadership election, Haigh supported Owen Smith.

In the 2020 leadership election, Haigh chaired the leadership campaign of Lisa Nandy. She also nominated Angela Rayner for Deputy.

References

External links

1987 births
21st-century British women politicians
Alumni of the University of Nottingham
Female members of the Parliament of the United Kingdom for English constituencies
Labour Party (UK) MPs for English constituencies
Living people
Metropolitan Special Constabulary officers
People educated at Sheffield High School, South Yorkshire
Politics of Sheffield
Trade unionists from Sheffield
UK MPs 2015–2017
UK MPs 2017–2019
UK MPs 2019–present
Women Metropolitan Police officers